The House at 5 Bennett Street in Wakefield, Massachusetts, is also known as the Wakefield House for Aged Women, and is one of the largest houses in Wakefield's Junction District.  The original part of the house was built sometime between 1875 and 1881, with Italianate styling.  It was probably built for an executive of the Wakefield Rattan Company.  In 1894 the house was purchased by the Wakefield House for Aged Women, a charity established by local Protestant churches, and significantly expanded.  During this major alteration some of the house's Italianate details were copied, and a Queen Anne style porch was added.

The building was listed on the National Register of Historic Places in 1989.

See also
National Register of Historic Places listings in Wakefield, Massachusetts
National Register of Historic Places listings in Middlesex County, Massachusetts

References

Houses in Wakefield, Massachusetts
Houses on the National Register of Historic Places in Wakefield, Massachusetts
Italianate architecture in Massachusetts
Houses completed in 1875